St. Louis Magazine is a monthly periodical published in St. Louis, Missouri. Founded in 1969 under the name Replay, then The St. Louisan until 1977, it covers local history, cuisine, and lifestyles.

History
The magazine started under the name Replay in 1969. Its president and publisher was Steve Apted, and its editor was Doris Lieberman.  The home office was in the basement of the local "Cheshire Inn" hotel. From 1969 to 1977 it was known as St. Louisan , then changing to its current title of St. Louis magazine . In 1990 it was acquired by the St. Louis Business Journal. In 1994 it was acquired by Hartmann Publishing, the owner of The Riverfront Times, and eventually took on as its editor the author Harper Barnes, who remained until 2001, and then left to concentrate on writing books, though he remained as senior writer and movie columnist. In 1998, Hartmann Publishing sold The Riverfront Times to New Times Media and retained St. Louis Magazine.

References

External links
 Official website

1969 establishments in Missouri
Lifestyle magazines published in the United States
Local interest magazines published in the United States
Magazines established in 1969
Magazines published in St. Louis
Monthly magazines published in the United States